Sharmin Akter is a Bangladeshi activist against child and forced marriages. She resisted her mother's efforts to get her married at the age of 15 to a 32-year-old man and fought to continue her education. A student of Rajapur Pilot Girls High School. She wants to become a lawyer to fight child and forced marriages. She is an International Women of Courage Award recipient.

Akter was praised in 2017 by her school's headteacher for successfully completing her exams despite the distractions.

References

External links
 

Bangladeshi women activists
Living people
Year of birth missing (living people)
Bangladeshi human rights activists
Recipients of the International Women of Courage Award